The Master of Ballantrae is a 1953 British Technicolor adventure film starring Errol Flynn and Roger Livesey. It is a loose and highly truncated adaptation of the Robert Louis Stevenson 1889 novel of the same name. In eighteenth century Scotland, two sons of a laird clash over the family estate and a lady.

It was the last film from director William Keighley.

Plot
At the Durrisdeer estate in Scotland in 1745, Jamie Durie (Errol Flynn), his younger brother Henry (Anthony Steel) and their father Lord Durrisdeer (Felix Aylmer) receive news of the Jacobite rising. Their retainer, MacKellar (Mervyn Johns), recommends that one brother join the uprising while the other remains loyal to King George II, so that whichever side wins, the family's status and estate will be preserved. Both brothers want to go. Jamie insists on tossing a coin for the privilege and wins, despite the opposition of his fiancée, Lady Alison (Beatrice Campbell).

The rising is crushed at the Battle of Culloden. Evading British soldiers, Jamie falls in with an Irish adventurer, Colonel Francis Burke (Roger Livesey). They return secretly to Durrisdeer to obtain money for passage to France.

When Jamie's commoner mistress, Jessie Brown (Yvonne Furneaux), sees him kissing Lady Alison, she betrays him to the English. Jamie is shot by Major Clarendon and falls into the sea. Henry becomes the heir to the estate on the presumption that Jamie is dead.

Believing his brother betrayed him, a wounded Jamie and Burke take ship with smugglers to the West Indies, where they are betrayed by their captain McCauley and captured by pirates led by French dandy Captain Arnaud (Jacques Berthier).

Jamie goes into partnership with Arnaud. When they reach the port of Tortugas Bay, they see a rich Spanish galleon captured by fellow buccaneer Captain Mendoza (Charles Goldner). Arnaud agrees to Jamie's proposal that they steal the ship. However, once they have seized the galleon, Arnaud turns on Jamie. Jamie kills Arnaud in a sword duel and takes command. They sail for Scotland.

Jamie returns to the family estate, rich with pirate treasure, to find a celebration in progress for Henry's betrothal to Alison. Unable to contain himself, Jamie confronts his brother, despite the presence of British officers. A fight breaks out, in which Henry tries to aid Jamie. The unequal fight ends with Jamie and Burke condemned to death.

Jessie helps them escape, at the cost of her own life. Henry also assists them. Jamie tells his brother of the location of some treasure which Henry can then use to pay off Jamie's gambling debts. Alison elects to go with Jamie to an uncertain future and she, Burke and Jamie all ride off together.

Cast
 Errol Flynn as Jamie Durie
 Roger Livesey as Colonel Francis Burke
 Anthony Steel as Henry Durie
 Beatrice Campbell as Lady Alison
 Yvonne Furneaux as Jessie Brown
 Felix Aylmer as Lord Durrisdeer
 Mervyn Johns as MacKellar
 Charles Goldner as Captain Mendoza
 Ralph Truman as Major Clarendon
 Francis de Wolff as Matthew Bull, Arnaud's Quarter Master
 Jacques Berthier as Captain Arnaud
 Gillian Lynne as Marianne, a dancer favored by Mendoza

Production

Development
Walker Whiteside toured the US with a play version of the novel in 1935.

Warner Bros purchased the screen rights to the novel in 1950. The novel was in the public domain in the US but still in copyright in certain European countries. The purchase was made with funds "frozen" by the British government i.e. money earned by Warners in Britain which they could not take out of the country.

Warner Bros announced on 7 September 1950 that they would make the film, with shooting to take place in England. (Warners had just made another sea-faring tale, Captain Horatio Hornblower, in England.) The following year it was announced that Joe Gottesman would be producer and Herb Meadow was doing the adaptation.| In 1952 it was announced that Errol Flynn would star and the film would be known as The Sea Rogue. Anthony Steel, who had impressed in some British films, was signed to play his brother; it was his biggest role in a Hollywood financed film to date.

Filming
The film was shot in Great Britain in 1952 from June 25 through to August, with location work in Cornwall and the Scottish Highlands with the pirate sequences done in Palermo in Sicily. Shooting took place six days a week.

Fencing champion Sgt Robert Anderson from the (British) Royal Marines went on leave to participate in the film.

Filming went very smoothly, in contrast to many Errol Flynn movies around this time. The star was co-operative and well behaved and enjoyed the experience.

"Playing in that period piece made me realise how that must have been the heyday of great lovers", Flynn said. "In the 18th century men treated their women either angels or scullery maids. You were either gallantly or roughly romantic, and the women expected it one way or the other."

Reception

Critical
The New York Times called it Flynn's best swashbuckler since The Sea Hawk. "Flynn himself hasn't been served better in years", wrote the Los Angeles Times.

The Washington Post called the film "a chaotic tale deserving of his [Flynn's] undisputed prowess."

Filmink magazine wrote that "the story has no real villain and is robbed of its point."

It was the last film Flynn made under contract to Warner Bros., ending an association that had lasted for 18 years and 35 films.

References

External links
 
 
 
 
Review at Variety

1953 films
Films shot at Associated British Studios
Films based on British novels
Films based on works by Robert Louis Stevenson
Films directed by William Keighley
Films set in Scotland
Films set in the 1740s
Pirate films
British swashbuckler films
Warner Bros. films
Films scored by William Alwyn
Jacobite rising of 1745 films
1950s historical adventure films
British historical adventure films
1950s English-language films
1950s British films